William Cloutier is a Canadian pop singer from Victoriaville, Quebec. most noted as the 2021 winner of Star Académie,

During his run on Star Académie, he was granted permission to be temporarily absent from the competition when his wife, Sara Dagenais, went into labour and gave birth to their son Éloi.

He released his debut album On ira in 2022, and supported the album with a concert tour alongside Lunou Zucchini, another Star Académie finalist. On ira received a Félix Award nomination for Pop Album of the Year at the 44th Félix Awards.

Cloutier has also had roles as an actor, including voicing the role of Lyle in the francophone dub of Lyle, Lyle, Crocodile, and playing Johnny Rockfort in a production of the musical Starmania.

References

External link

21st-century Canadian male singers
21st-century Canadian male actors
Canadian pop singers
Canadian male voice actors
Canadian male musical theatre actors
French Quebecers
Male actors from Quebec
Singers from Quebec
Participants in Canadian reality television series
People from Victoriaville
Living people
Year of birth missing (living people)